Manda III is a mountain of the Garhwal Himalaya in Uttarakhand India. It is joint 81st highest located entirely within the Uttarakhand. Nanda Devi, is the highest mountain in this category. It lies 2.4 km south of Manda II  and 2.8 km north of Bhrigupanth . It lies 6.6 km east of Jogin II . It is located 6.7 km NW of Shivling (mountain)  and 13.1 km east lies Bhagirathi Parbat II .

Climbing history

A four-member team of Dalriada Climbing Club, Ireland comprising Andy Cunningham, Richard Mansfield, Gary Murray and Ian Rea climbed Manda III via the southeast flank and southwest ridge.  On September 22, they reached the summit in alpine-style it took five days from base camp and to descend. According to them this was the first ascent. A previous British attempt at the peak from the northwest face and north ridge in 1986 failed at 6100 meters.

Neighboring and subsidiary peaks
neighboring or subsidiary peaks of Manda III:
 Thalay Sagar: 
 Meru Peak: 
 Shivling: 
 Gangotri I: 
 Gangotri II: 
 Gangotri III: 
 Jogin II:

Glaciers and rivers
On the western side lies Kedar Bamak and on the eastern side lies Bhrigupanth Bamak. Kedar Ganga emerges from Kedar bamak and joins Bhagirathi River near Gangotri. Bhrigupanth Bamak drain down to Bhagirathi River near Bhojwas. Bhagirathi joins the Alaknanda River the other main tributaries of river Ganga at Dev Prayag and called Ganga there after.

See also

 List of Himalayan peaks of Uttarakhand

References

Mountains of Uttarakhand
Six-thousanders of the Himalayas
Geography of Chamoli district